The 1924 Ice Hockey European Championship was the ninth edition of the ice hockey tournament for European countries associated to the International Ice Hockey Federation.

The tournament was played between March 14, and March 17, 1924, in Milan, Italy, and it was won by France.

Results

Group A

March 14

March 15

March 16

Standings Group A

Group B

March 14

March 15

March 16

Standings Group B

Final

March 17

Top Goalscorer

Albert De Rauch (France), 7 goals

References
 Euro Championship 1924

European Championships
European Championships,1924
1924
March 1924 sports events
Sports competitions in Milan
1924 Ice Hockey European Championships